Islamic law may refer to:
 Sharia, Islamic divine law derived from the religious precepts of Islam
 consens of Ulama (Fiqh) based on Quran and Hadith traditions.
 Qanun, Islamic dynastic law established by Islamic sovereigns, in particular the Ottoman sultans